Ghost Tropic is the fifth regular studio album by Songs: Ohia. It was recorded by Mike Mogis at Dead Space Recording Studio in Lincoln, Nebraska. The album's name refers to two short instrumentals that are surrounded by six vocal tracks of at least five and up to twelve minutes length. The reviews noted the somber and dark mood permeating the album. According to Pitchfork Media, "Ghost Tropic (...) sounds as though it were recorded live in a haunted hut somewhere in an Ecuadorian rainforest. At night." AllMusic was less sanguine: "Everything moves as slowly as a three-legged dog, and anyone neither patient enough nor attuned to Molina's style of songcraft (imagine Neil Young doing very mellow gypsy folk music) might very well be put to sleep."

Track listing
 "Lightning Risked It All" – 5:39
 "The Body Burned Away" – 5:35
 "No Limits on the Words" – 5:21
 "Ghost Tropic" – 2:36
 "Ocean's Nerves" – 5:03
 "Not Just a Ghost's Heart" – 12:02
 "Ghost Tropic" – 3:09
 "Incantation" – 11:53

Recording information
 Jason Molina
 Shane Aspegren
 Mike Mogis
 Alasdair Roberts
 Songs by Jason Molina
 Recorded by Mike Mogis

References

External links
 Secretly Canadian press release

2000 albums
Jason Molina albums
Secretly Canadian albums
Albums produced by Mike Mogis